Shae Davies (born 8 March 1990) is an Australian professional racing driver. A Super2 Series veteran, Davies briefly drove for Erebus Motorsport during the 2016 V8 Supercars season. He currently competes in the S5000 Australian Drivers' Championship and Tasman Series.

Davies began competing outside of Australia in 2019 after sponsorship issues prevented him from continuing the Supercars developmental ladder. In 2019, he raced for Belgian Audi Club Team WRT in the Blancpain GT World Challenge Europe. He returned to Australia in 2020 to compete in the Boost Mobile Super Trucks. In his maiden Super Trucks race weekend at the Adelaide 500, he won the third round after taking the lead following the competition caution. The following year, he won twice at Tasmania and Darwin to tie with Paul Morris for the Boost Mobile Super Trucks championship, losing on a tiebreaker as Morris had four wins.

When the Boost Mobile Super Trucks shut down after the 2021 season, Davies joined Versa Motorsport in the S5000 Australian Drivers' Championship and Tasman Series for 2022.

Career results

Supercars Championship results

Bathurst 1000 results

Boost Mobile Super Trucks
(key) (Bold – Pole position. Italics – Fastest qualifier. * – Most laps led.)

 Standings were not recorded by the series for the 2020 season.

Complete S5000 results

References

External links
 Website

1990 births
Formula Ford drivers
Living people
Supercars Championship drivers
Australian racing drivers
Stadium Super Trucks drivers
Australian Endurance Championship drivers
Blancpain Endurance Series drivers
W Racing Team drivers
Wayne Taylor Racing drivers
Matt Stone Racing drivers
Craft-Bamboo Racing drivers